Artinsky District is an administrative district (raion), one of the thirty in Sverdlovsk Oblast, Russia. As a municipal division, it is incorporated as Artinsky Urban Okrug. It is located in the southwest of the oblast. Its administrative center is the urban locality (a work settlement) of Arti. As of the 2010 Census, the total population of the district was 29,624, with the population of Arti accounting for 43.5% of that number.

The Artinskian Age of the Permian Period of geological time was named for the Artinsk area.

References

Notes

Sources

Districts of Sverdlovsk Oblast